Russell Township is one of thirteen townships in Putnam County, Indiana. As of the 2010 census, its population was 823 and it contained 361 housing units.

Russell Township was established in 1828.

Geography

Cities and towns
 Russellville

Unincorporated towns
 Blakesburg at 
(This list is based on USGS data and may include former settlements.)

References

External links
 Indiana Township Association
 United Township Association of Indiana

Townships in Putnam County, Indiana
Townships in Indiana